Botz is a German language surname. It stems from the male given name Burchard – and may refer to:
Bob Botz (1935), former Major League Baseball relief pitcher
Gerhard Botz (1955), German politician
Gregory H. Botz (1962), American intensive care specialist physician
Gustav Botz (1883–1932), German actor

References

German-language surnames
Surnames from given names